is a Japanese actress, voice actress, tarento, World Wide Fund for Nature advisor, and Goodwill Ambassador for UNICEF. She is well known for her charitable works, and is considered one of the first Japanese celebrities to achieve international recognition. In 2006, Donald Richie referred to Kuroyanagi in his book Japanese Portraits: Pictures of Different People as "the most popular and admired woman in Japan."

Early life 
Kuroyanagi was born in Tokyo City, Tokyo Prefecture (now Tokyo). Her father was a violinist and a concertmaster. Her nickname as a child was Totto-chan, according to her 1981 Autobiographical memoir.

Education 
Kuroyanagi studied at the Tokyo College of Music, majoring in opera, as she intended to become an opera singer. After graduation, however, she was drawn to acting and the television entertainment industry by her joining Tokyo Hoso Gekidan. Subsequently, she became the first Japanese actress who was contracted to Japan Broadcasting Corporation (NHK).

Career 

After voicing Lady Penelope in the Thunderbirds TV series, Kuroyanagi first became well known in 1975 when she established her afternoon television program , which was the first talk show on Japanese television. The show was broadcast by the private television channel Television Asahi, and featured Kuroyanagi's discussions with celebrities from various fields, including television, sport and politics. Tetsuko's Room was very successful, and Kuroyanagi started to be referred to as a "phenomenon" in Japan, in contradiction to the image of "servile" and "wifely" women on Japanese television". Statistics show that, by the early 1990s, Kuroyanagi had interviewed over two thousand Japanese and foreign guests. It is acknowledged that her warmness as an interviewer and skilled art of talking is a factor that made the TV program live long. She is also familiar to Japanese audiences with her regular appearance on the television quiz show "World Mysteries".

1981 marked a turning point in her career, as Kuroyanagi published her children book Totto-Chan: The Little Girl at the Window, in which Kuroyanagi wrote about the values of the unconventional education that she received at Tomoe Gakuen elementary school during World War II, and her teacher Sosaku Kobayashi. The book is considered her childhood memoir, and upon release, it became the bestselling book in Japanese history. The book was first translated to English in 1984 by Dorothy Britton, and it was published in more than 30 countries.

Charitable works 

Kuroyanagi is known internationally for her charitable and fund raising works. She founded the Totto Foundation, named for the eponymous and autobiographical protagonist of her book Totto-chan, the Little Girl at the Window. The Foundation professionally trains deaf actors, implementing Kuroyanagi's vision of bringing theater to the deaf.

In 1984, in recognition of her charitable works, Kuroyanagi was appointed to be a Goodwill Ambassador for UNICEF, being the first person from Asia to hold this position. During the late 1980s and the 1990s, she visited many developing countries in Asia and Africa for charitable works and goodwill missions, helping children who had suffered from disasters and war as well as raising international awareness of the situations of children in poor countries. Her visit to Angola in 1989 was the first recorded VIP visit from Japan to this country, and marked a milestone for the diplomatic relation between Japan and Angola. Kuroyanagi has raised more than $20 million for the UNICEF programmes that she has been involved in, through television fund-raising campaigns. She also used the royalties from her bestselling book, Totto-chan, to contribute to UNICEF. Kuroyanagi also participated in the international UNICEF ‘Say Yes for Children’ campaign, along with other celebrities.

In 1997, Kuroyanagi published the book "Totto-chan's Children", which was based on her experience working for as a UNICEF Goodwill Ambassador from 1984 to 1996. Kuroyanagi is a director of the Japanese branch of the World Wildlife Fund.

Kuroyanagi has twice brought America's National Theater of the Deaf to Japan,  acting with them in sign language.

Honours 
For her involvement in media and television entertainment, Kuroyanagi won the Japanese Cultural Broadcasting Award, which is the highest television honour in Japan. Since then, she has been voted 14 times as Japan’s favourite television personality, for the show Tetsuko’s Room.

In 2000, Kuroyanagi became the first recipient of the Global Leadership for Children Award, which was established by UNICEF in the 10th anniversary of the 1990 World Summit for Children. In May 2003, Kuroyanagi received Order of the Sacred Treasure in recognition of her two decades of service for the world’s children.

Filmography 
This is a partial list of films.
 Thunderbirds (voice actor) (1965-1966) - Lady Penelope Creighton-Ward (Japanese dub)
 Jack and the Witch (voice actor) (1967)
 Breaking of Branches Is Forbidden (voice actor) (1968, dir. Kihachirō Kawamoto)
 Summer Soldiers (1972)
 Anne no Nikki (The Diary of Anne Frank) as Mrs. Petronella Van Daan (voice actor) (1995)
 The Book of the Dead (voice actor) (2005)

References

External links 

 
 Official Homepage as Totto channel 
 Homepage for Tetsuko's Room 
 

1933 births
Living people
Japanese non-fiction writers
Japanese philanthropists
Japanese radio personalities
Japanese television personalities
Japanese television presenters
Japanese women television presenters
Japanese film actresses
Japanese television actresses
Japanese voice actresses
Japanese women essayists
Persons of Cultural Merit
Recipients of the Order of the Sacred Treasure
UNICEF Goodwill Ambassadors
Voice actresses from Tokyo
World Wide Fund for Nature
20th-century Japanese actresses
21st-century Japanese actresses